Isidro Marcelino Bauza Cárdenas (1908 - death date unknown) was a Cuban baseball shortstop in the Negro leagues and Mexican League. He played with the Cuban Stars (West) in 1930, before spending time with several Mexican League clubs from 1937 to 1945.

References

External links
 and Baseball-Reference Black Baseball / Mexican League stats and Seamheads 

1908 births
Year of death missing
Cuban Stars (West) players
Cafeteros de Córdoba players
Gallos de Santa Rosa players
Alijadores de Tampico players
Angeles de Puebla players
Azules de Veracruz players
Algodoneros de Unión Laguna players
Industriales de Monterrey players
Tecolotes de Nuevo Laredo players
Cuban baseball players
Baseball shortstops
Cuban expatriate baseball players in Mexico